Carl Laufs (1858-1900) was a German playwright who concentrated largely on creating farces,  notably the 1890 work Pension Schöller which he co-authored with Wilhelm Jacoby.

Bibliography
 Grange, William. Historical Dictionary of German Theater. Scarecrow Press, 2006.

1858 births
1900 deaths
Writers from Mainz
People from Rhenish Hesse
German male writers